Cerium(IV) fluoride is an inorganic compound with a chemical formula CeF4. It is a strong oxidant that appears as a white crystalline material. Cerium(IV) fluoride has an anhydrous form and a monohydrate form.

Production and properties
Cerium(IV) fluoride can be produced by fluorinating cerium(III) fluoride or cerium dioxide with fluorine gas at 500 °C

Its hydrated form (CeF4·xH2O, x≤1) can be produced by reacting 40% hydrofluoric acid and cerium(IV) sulfate solution at 90°C.

Cerium(IV) fluoride can dissolve in DMSO, and react to form the coordination complex [CeF4(DMSO)2].

References

Fluorides
Cerium(IV) compounds
Lanthanide halides